Tora Suber (born November 23, 1974) is a former professional basketball player who played for the Charlotte Sting and Orlando Miracle in the WNBA. She played a total of 83 games.

High school
Suber and Tina Nicholson were teammates at Downingtown High School in the early 1990s. Suber graduated in 1993. In total she recorded 2,420 career points and helped the team win four District 1 titles and two state crowns.

Personal life
Suber was born prematurely to a 15-year-old mother. She earned a bachelor's degree in English literature at Virginia.

Career statistics

Regular season

|-
| style="text-align:left;"|1997
| style="text-align:left;"|Charlotte
| 28 || 8 || 17.0 || .370 || .397 || .683 || 1.5 || 2.0 || 0.5 || 0.1 || 1.8 || 4.7
|-
| style="text-align:left;"|1998
| style="text-align:left;"|Charlotte
| 30 || 12 || 22.7 || .314 || .310 || .630 || 1.8 || 2.9 || 1.0 || 0.0 || 1.5 || 6.0
|-
| style="text-align:left;"|1999
| style="text-align:left;"|Orlando
| 25 || 0 || 4.6 || .292 || .111 || .500 || 0.5 || 0.4 || 0.2 || 0.0 || 0.4 || 0.8
|-
| style="text-align:left;"|Career
| style="text-align:left;"|3 years, 2 teams
| 83 || 20 || 15.3 || .331 || .328 || .639 || 1.3 || 1.8 || 0.6 || 0.0 || 1.3 || 4.0

Playoffs

|-
| style="text-align:left;"|1997
| style="text-align:left;"|Charlotte
| 1 || 0 || 7.0 || .000 || — || — || 0.0 || 1.0 || 0.0 || 0.0 || 1.0 || 0.0
|-
| style="text-align:left;"|1998
| style="text-align:left;"|Charlotte
| 2 || 2 || 37.5 || .391 || .250 || .667 || 1.0 || 5.0 || 2.5 || 0.0 || 3.5 || 11.5
|-
| style="text-align:left;"|Career
| style="text-align:left;"|2 years, 1 team
| 3 || 2 || 27.0 || .375 || .250 || .667 || 0.7 || 3.7 || 1.7 || 0.0 || 2.7 || 7.7

References

1974 births
Living people
Basketball players from Pennsylvania
Guards (basketball)
Charlotte Sting players
Orlando Miracle players
People from Coatesville, Pennsylvania
Virginia Cavaliers women's basketball players